Altcar Training Camp is located in Hightown, Merseyside, England. The  estate is composed of beaches, marshland, fields and small woods. The range is run by the North West Reserve Forces & Cadets Association.

History
William Molyneux, 4th Earl of Sefton first made the site available for the Grand Lancashire Rifle Contest on 29 October 1860. He donated the land to the Volunteer Forces two years later. A railway station was established near the site in 1862 but closed in 1921. The site, which had been known as Altcar Rifle Range, was renamed Altcar Training Camp in 1970. In February 2016 a pavilion was burnt to the ground in a controlled fire to make way for new facilities.

Gallery

References

Shooting ranges in the United Kingdom
Rifle ranges
Metropolitan Borough of Sefton
Military history of Merseyside
Shooting sports in England
Barracks in England